The following is a list of jump blues musicians.

Alberta Adams
Sil Austin
LaVern Baker
Big Maybelle 
Big Three Trio
Calvin Boze
Tiny Bradshaw 
Jackie Brenston
Nappy Brown 
Roy Brown
Ruth Brown
Arnett Cobb
Floyd Dixon
Willie Dixon
H-Bomb Ferguson
Jimmy Forrest
Clarence Garlow
Stomp Gordon
Tiny Grimes
Peppermint Harris 
Wynonie Harris 
Joe Houston
Bull Moose Jackson
Willis "Gator" Jackson 
Illinois Jacquet 
Buddy Johnson 
Eddie Johnson
Ella Johnson  
Louis Jordan
Al Killian
Annie Laurie
Julia Lee
Joe Liggins 
Jimmy Liggins 
Little Willie Littlefield
Big Jay McNeely 
Jay McShann 
Amos Milburn 
Lucky Millinder 
Roy Milton 
Ella Mae Morse
Elmore Nixon
Johnny Otis
Flip Phillips
Sammy Price 
Louis Prima 
Red Prysock
Ike Quebec
Roomful of Blues
Jimmy Rushing
Sam Taylor 
The Treniers
Big Joe Turner 
Titus Turner
Eddie Vinson
Cootie Williams
Jimmy Witherspoon
Mitch Woods

References

AllMusic

Jump